The Double Decawatt Package, D2PAK, SOT404 or DDPAK, standardized as TO-263, is a semiconductor package type intended for surface mounting on circuit boards. The TO-263 is designed by Motorola. They are similar to the earlier TO-220-style packages intended for high power dissipation but lack the extended metal tab and mounting hole, while representing a larger version of the TO-252, also known as DPAK, SMT package. As with all SMT packages, the pins on a D2PAK are bent to lie against the PCB surface. The TO-263 can have 3 to 7 terminals.

Dimensions

Variants 
Texas instruments has a smaller version of the TO-263: the TO-263 THIN. The height of the TO-263 THIN is 2 mm instead of the standard 4.5 mm.

See also
TO-220, through hole version of the TO-263

References

External links

Package information from Fairchild
 Mechanical drawings from National Semiconductor
 Mechanical drawings of D2PAK from ON Semiconductor

Semiconductor packages